Fairview Township is a township in Cowley County, Kansas, USA.  As of the 2000 census, its population was 203.

Geography
According to the USGS, it contains one cemetery, Akron.

The streams of Dutch Creek, Foos Creek and Little Dutch Creek run through this township.

References
 USGS Geographic Names Information System (GNIS)

External links
 City-Data.com

Townships in Cowley County, Kansas
Townships in Kansas